Lygodium palmatum is the only species of its genus native to North America.  Unlike most species in the genus, this one, called the American climbing fern (or Hartford fern, after Hartford, Connecticut), is extremely hardy in temperate zones.

This fern is on endangered or threatened species lists in several states.  It requires constant moisture, high light levels, and intensely acid soil to thrive. Its range is essentially Appalachian, ranging from New England down through the Appalachians, Piedmont and Appalachian plateaus into the American south.

References

Lellinger, David B. A Field Manual of the Ferns & Fern Allies of the United States & Canada. Smithsonian Institution, Washington, DC. 1985.

External links

palmatum